The 1894 Navy Midshipmen football team represented the United States Naval Academy during the 1894 college football season. In their first and only season under head coach William Wurtenburg, the Midshipmen compiled a 4–1–2 record, shut out three opponents, and outscored all opponents by a combined score of 72 to 30. The Army–Navy Game was canceled due to Presidential cabinet order.

Schedule

References

Navy
Navy Midshipmen football seasons
Navy Midshipmen football